Ryan Wetnight (November 5, 1970May 1, 2020) was an American professional football player who was a tight end for eight seasons with the Chicago Bears and Green Bay Packers in the National Football League (NFL). He finished his career with 175 receptions for 1,542 yards and 9 touchdowns in 101 games.

Upon concluding his playing career, Wetnight became a real estate broker in California. In 2019, he was hired as the wide receivers coach at Grace Brethren High School.

In 2018, he was diagnosed with gastric cancer. Although the cancer was treated by January 2019, an inoperable tumor developed near his stomach later that year. Wetnight died on May 1, 2020 at 49.

References

1970 births
2020 deaths
Businesspeople from California
Sportspeople from Fresno, California
Players of American football from California
American football tight ends
Chicago Bears players
Green Bay Packers players
Stanford Cardinal football players
Deaths from stomach cancer
Deaths from cancer in California
Ed Block Courage Award recipients
Brian Piccolo Award winners